Howard Ferguson Jr. (August 5, 1930 – December 18, 2005) was a professional American football player.  He played as a fullback and halfback for six seasons in the National Football League (NFL) with the Green Bay Packers and one season in the American Football League (AFL) with the Los Angeles Chargers.

Biography
Ferguson grew up in Louisiana, where he competed in football, basketball, baseball, and boxing at New Iberia High School. He enlisted in the Navy on Jan. 8, 1948 and served during the Korean War as a member of the frogman underwater demolition team.  During the off-season he worked as an oil field worker in New Iberia.  Although he never played college football, Ferguson was discovered while playing football for the Navy in California by a scout for the NFL's Los Angeles Rams.  (He had played football with the Navy League Amphibian Division and was an MVP, earning second-team All-Navy honors two years in a row.) After playing four years of service football, the Navy discharged Ferguson on Jan. 7, 1952, he signed with the Los Angeles Rams on June 11 and was waived on Sept. 19. The Rams signed him but he was released prior to the 1952 season and then was signed by the Green Bay Packers as a free agent in 1953.  The 6'2", 210-pound Ferguson gained 2,120 yards rushing and 1,079 yards receiving with the Packers between 1953 and 1958.

In 1955 Ferguson had over 1,000 yards combined rushing and receiving for the Packers, earning him a spot on the Pro Bowl roster as a fullback alongside Heisman Trophy winner and NFL Rookie of the Year Alan Ameche of the Baltimore Colts.  Ferguson retired in 1959 after multiple injuries, but had a brief comeback in 1960 during the inaugural season of the Los Angeles Chargers of the American Football League (AFL).  In 1974 Howard Ferguson was inducted into the Green Bay Packers Hall of Fame

For more information, go to the Green Bay Packers Hall of Fame history website:
https://www.packers.com/history/hof/howie-ferguson

See also
 List of American Football League players

References

1930 births
2005 deaths
American football fullbacks
American football halfbacks
Green Bay Packers players
Los Angeles Chargers players
Western Conference Pro Bowl players
People from New Iberia, Louisiana
Players of American football from Louisiana

https://www.packers.com/history/hof/howie-ferguson